Polysiphonia stricta is a small red marine alga in the Division Rhodophyta.

Polysiphonia stricta forms dense clumps of branching axes. The plants grow to 25 cm high.

Description
P. stricta grows as small tufts of much branched tufts, growing to no more than 25 cm high. The axes are erect, ecorticate, with 4 periaxial cells growing from prostrate axes. All 4 of the periaxial cells are of the same length.

Reproduction
Spermatangial branchlets are formed in clusters at the apices. Cystocarps are on wide stalks and are urceolate. The tetraspores are in series in the final branches.

Habitat
Epizoic and epiphytic in the low littoral to 20 m.

Distribution
Found around the British Isles, the West Atlantic and American Atlantic.

References

Rhodomelaceae